Pedro Bazán Romero (26 March 1922 – 26 May 1992) was a Spanish footballer who played as a forward.

Club career
Born into a family of bullfighters, in La Algaba on 26 March 1922, Bazán began his football career at Sevilla. Bazán picked up a meniscus injury whilst at Sevilla, halting his progress with the club. Bazán moved onto Sparta Sevilla, CD Algabeño, Hércules de Cadiz and Olímpica Jiennense, before signing for Málaga in December 1946.

On 5 January 1947, Bazán scored his first goal for Málaga, in his second game, scoring the winner in a 2–1 away win against Alcoyano. The 1947–48 Segunda División season proved to be prolific for Bazán. On 5 October 1947, Bazán scored five goals against Badalona in an 8–3 victory. On 4 January 1948, Bazán scored a triple hat-trick against Hércules in a 9–2 win.  Bazán finished the 1947–48 season with 29 goals in 26 Segunda División appearances. The following season, Bazán finished the campaign as top scorer, scoring five hat-tricks, as Málaga gained promotion to the Primera División. On 15 March 1953, Bazán scored an 11-minute hat-trick against Real Madrid.

In 1954, Bazán signed for Deportivo La Coruña. Bazán scored one hat-trick for Deportivo, in a 4–0 win against Real Sociedad on 14 October 1956.

International career
Bazán made a single appearance for Spain B, scoring in a 5–2 victory against Portugal B on 20 March 1949. Bazán also missed a penalty in the game, however the referee ordered a retake due to a fault by Portugal's goalkeeper Manuel Capela. Silvestre Igoa took, and scored, the subsequent penalty.

International goals
Scores and results list Spain B's goal tally first.

Managerial career
Following his retirement, Bazán managed CD Veleño and Fuengirola.

References

1922 births
1992 deaths
Spanish footballers
People from Vega del Guadalquivir
Sportspeople from the Province of Seville
Association football forwards
Real Jaén footballers
CD Málaga footballers
Deportivo de La Coruña players
La Liga players
Segunda División players
Spain B international footballers
CD Fuengirola managers
Spanish football managers